Giorgio Cittadini (born 18 April 2002) is an Italian professional footballer who plays as a centre-back for  club Modena, on loan from Atalanta.

Club career

Early career and Atalanta 
Born in Gardone Val Trompia, Cittadini started playing at Lumezzane before joining Atalanta's youth sector in 2016, aged 14. Although he did not play consistently until he joined the under-17 team, he progressively came through the club's youth ranks, winning a national championship and two Super Cups with the under-19 team in 2020 and 2021.

On 9 January 2022, Cittadini made his professional debut for Atalanta, coming in as a 90th-minute substitute in a 6–2 Serie A win against Udinese.

Loan to Modena 
On 7 July 2022, Cittadini joined newly-promoted Serie B club Modena on a season-long loan. Throughout the 2022–23 season, he established himself as a regular starter in the side, being praised for his league performances.

International career 
Cittadini made three appearances with the Italian under-18 national team in 2019 and 2020.

In June 2022, he received his first call-up to the under-20 national team, subsequently making his debut with the Azzurrini on June 7, coming in as a substitute during the 1–0 home loss against Poland.

On 22 September of the same year, he also made his debut with the under-21 national team, playing the second half of a friendly match against England.

In December 2022, he was involved in a training camp led by the Italian senior national team's manager, Roberto Mancini, and aimed to the most promising national talents.

Style of play 
Cittadini is a centre-back, who can play either in a back four or in a back three: he has been mainly regarded for his strength, his positioning and his ball-playing skills.

Career statistics

Club

References

External links 

 
 

2002 births
Living people
Sportspeople from the Province of Brescia
Italian footballers
Association football defenders
Italy youth international footballers
Serie A players
Atalanta B.C. players
Modena F.C. 2018 players